Dastjerd-e Olya (also Romanized as Dastjerd-e ‘Olyā; also known as Dastjerd and Dastjird) is a village in Eqbal-e Sharqi Rural District, in the Central District of Qazvin County, Qazvin Province, Iran. At the 2006 census, its population was 647, in 155 families.

References 

Populated places in Qazvin County